Clintonia borealis is a species of flowering plant in the lily family Liliaceae. The specific epithet borealis means "of the north," which alludes to the fact that the species tends to thrive in the boreal forests of eastern Canada and northeastern United States.

Clintonia borealis is commonly known as bluebead, bluebead lily, or yellow clintonia. The term "bluebead" refers to the plant's small blue spherical fruit, perhaps its most striking feature. However, the term can be misleading since all but one of the species in genus Clintonia have blue fruits (notably, the fruit of C. umbellulata is black). Thus yellow clintonia is probably a better name for C. borealis since the adjective refers to the color of the plant's flower, a unique character among Clintonia species. Compound names such as yellow bead lily or yellow bluebead lily are also in use.

Other less common names include corn lily, poisonberry, or snakeberry. Some authors refer to C. borealis as Clinton's lily but that name may be more appropriate for the genus as a whole.

Description

Clintonia borealis is a small (5–10 in) perennial plant, usually found in homogeneous colonies. At full growth, a shoot has 2–4 clasping and curved, slightly succulent leaves with parallel venation. The flowers are arranged in small umbels at the extremity of a long stalk. They have 6 stamens and 6 yellow tepals (i.e. very similar sepals and petals). In rare cases more than one umbel is found on a shoot or shoots from a clone. The fruits are small dark blue, lurid berries, which are semi-poisonous. A white-berried form (f. albicarpa) also exists.

The plant reproduces via seed or vegetatively by underground rhizomes. By either method, the plants are slow to spread. One colony often covers several hundred square meters.

Taxonomy

In 1789, William Aiton described the species Dracaena borealis Aiton, a name that was to become a synonym for Clintonia borealis (Aiton) Raf. The latter was first described by Constantine Samuel Rafinesque in 1832. The species C. borealis was previously classified within the genus Convallaria.

Distribution

Clintonia borealis is a wide-ranging species in eastern North America, from Newfoundland and Labrador across New England into the Great Lakes region west to Manitoba and Minnesota. Its range extends southward into the Appalachian Mountains where it is allopatric with C. umbellulata, that is, the ranges of the two species do not significantly overlap but are immediately adjacent to one another.

C. borealis is globally secure but threatened in Maryland and Tennessee. It is an endangered species in Ohio and Indiana.

Ecology

Clintonia borealis is not found in open spaces, only growing in the shade. It is extremely slow to spread, but established clones can usually survive many later modifications, as long as sunlight remains limited. Whereas crossed pollination is more efficient in producing seeds, self-pollination will still produce seeds, allowing the plant to propagate.

Like other slow-growing forest plants, such as Trillium species, Clintonia is extremely sensitive to grazing by white-tailed deer.

Cultivation

Culture is difficult, due to the need to avoid direct sunlight and the difficulty posed by germination. Transplanting is not recommended.

Usage

Medicine
The rhizome contains diosgenin, a saponin steroid with estrogenic effects.

Food
The young leaves of the plant are edible while still only a few inches tall. The fruit however, is mildly toxic, and is quite unpleasant tasting.

Folklore

Hunters in North Quebec were said to have rubbed their traps with the roots because bears are attracted to its odor.

According to a Mi'kmaq tale, when a grass snake eats a poisonous toad, it slithers in rapid circles around a shoot of the bluebead lily to transfer the poison to the plant.

See also

 Bead lily
 List of plants known as lily

References

Bibliography

External links

 USWildflowers.com

borealis
Flora of Canada
Flora of the Northeastern United States
Flora of the Great Lakes region (North America)
Plants described in 1789